The start of season 2006-07 in Division Four South West was in contrast with the somewhat traditional – “good start – poor Christmas/New year – with a good end to the season”.
Up to the end of November six league games had been lost with a single victory at home to Trebanos. The only other win was a Swansea Valley 1st Round home game versus Alltwen.
In December to February team confidence did rally and five wins, two draws and only two defeats saw the side lift itself up, finishing the season with three wins in the last four games and a respectable 7th place out of 12. Welsh Cup progress was a dismal 1st Round defeat at home to district side Trefil and the West Wales Shield Merit Table finish 21st out of 31. The Swansea Valley Cup effort was a final versus Vardre up at Cwmtwrch, which we lost 13-8. Ystalyfera were completely outplayed by their much classier opponents.

Captain this season was the reliable Alun Guerrier, and top points scorer was Andrew Spratt with an accumulative 142 points. Top try scorer was the young Mathew Scott with 12.
Jonathan Evans won both the Players Player and Supporters Player of the year awards.

National League Division 4 South West

Ystalyfera 2006/07 Season Results

Ystalyfera 2006/07 Season Player Stats

References

Sport in Neath Port Talbot